St. Ignatius High School is a private Catholic secondary school located near Mahalakshmi Station in Mumbai, in the state of Maharashtra, India. The school is situated near the famous Mahalaxmi Racecourse, Kasturba Hospital, Dhobi Ghat and Arthur Road Jail. 

The school was founded by the Jesuits in 1914 and caters for students from Grade 5 to Grade 10. It was reported that the school is located on a heritage site worth watching.

References 

Jesuit secondary schools in India
Christian schools in Maharashtra
High schools and secondary schools in Mumbai
Educational institutions established in 1914
1914 establishments in India